RCAF Station Moncton or RCAF Aerodrome Moncton or BCATP Station Moncton, was a Second World War training air station of the British Commonwealth Air Training Plan (BCATP). It was located east of Moncton, New Brunswick, Canada.

History

World War II
The Moncton aerodrome was the home of No. 8 Service Flying Training School RCAF which operated from 23 December 1940 until the school was relocated to RCAF Station Weyburn 24 January 1944.

Aerodrome information
Six runways were listed as follows:

Relief landing field - Scoudouc
The primary relief landing field for RCAF Station Moncton was located west of the community of Scoudouc, New Brunswick. Three runways were listed as follows:

Relief landing field - Salisbury
The secondary relief landing field for RCAF Station Moncton was located northwest of the community of Salisbury, New Brunswick. Three runways were listed as follows:

Postwar
After the second world war, the property was converted into a civilian airport and is now operated as the Greater Moncton Roméo LeBlanc International Airport

References

Moncton
Moncton
Defunct airports in New Brunswick
Canadian Forces bases in Canada (closed)
Military history of New Brunswick
Military airbases in New Brunswick